Harrington is an unincorporated community in Bennett County, in the U.S. state of South Dakota.

History
Harrington was laid out in 1924. A post office was established at Harrington in 1924, and remained in operation until 1976.

Education
The Bennett County School District serves all of Bennett County.

References

Unincorporated communities in Bennett County, South Dakota
Unincorporated communities in South Dakota